Radio One 94.1 (DXLN 94.1 MHz) is an FM station owned and operated by M.I.T. Radio Television Network. Its studios and transmitter are located at Ariosa St., Brgy. Balangasan, Pagadian.

References

Radio stations in Zamboanga del Sur
Radio stations established in 1993